Kurevino is a rural locality (a village) in Zaborskoye Rural Settlement, Tarnogsky District, Vologda Oblast, Russia. The population was 6 as of 2002.

Geography 
Kurevino is located 29 km west of Tarnogsky Gorodok (the district's administrative centre) by road. Gusikha is the nearest rural locality.

References 

Rural localities in Tarnogsky District